Jules Semon Bache (November 9, 1861 – March 24, 1944) was an American banker, art collector and philanthropist.

Early life 
Jules Bache was born to a Jewish family in New York City. His father, Semon Bache [né Bach], emigrated to the United States from his native Nuremberg, Bavaria, settling in New York City where he started the glassmaking firm Semon Bache & Company.

Career
In 1881, he started work as a cashier at Leopold Cahn & Co., a stockbrokerage firm founded by his uncle. In 1886, he was made a minority partner and in 1892 took full control of the business, renaming it J. S. Bache & Co. Jules Bache built the company into one of the top brokerage houses in the United States, outranked only by Merrill Lynch. In the process, he became an immensely wealthy individual, a patron of the arts, and a philanthropist.

During World War I, Jules Bache donated money to the American Field Service in France and his wife was the honorary treasurer of the "War Babies' Cradle," a charity that provided aid for mothers and children in distress in war-torn Northern France and Belgium to provide them with food, clothing, heating fuel and medical care.

In the 1920 presidential election, Bache was a presidential elector for Warren G. Harding and Calvin Coolidge.

Jules Bache was a shareholder of a number of prominent corporations and sat on the board of directors of many of them. Among his personal holdings, Bache had sizeable interests in Canadian mining companies. His equity in these companies were held by his Bahamas based corporation that allowed him to legally avoid some of the high personal U.S. surtaxes, a fact which he would be publicly criticized for as a result of the Federal investigations during the 1930s into the causes of the Wall Street Crash of 1929. Bache, however, believed that high taxation was a hindrance to economic growth and published a booklet titled "Release business from the slavery of taxation." A major shareholder in Dome Mines Limited, Bache served as company president from 1919 until 1942 and was Chairman of the Board at the time of his passing. After the brokerage firm of Dillon, Read & Co. acquired the Dodge Brothers Automobile Company in 1923, Jules Bache acquired a substantial position in Chrysler Corporation.

A supporter of American theatre and Broadway, in 1941 Jules Bache helped found the New York branch of the Escholier Club.

Personal life and death
Bache married Florence R. Scheftel on May 23, 1892, and they had two daughters.

Jules Bache died in 1944 in Palm Beach, Florida and was interred in the Woodlawn Cemetery in the Bronx, New York. His tomb is a replica of the Trajan's Kiosk at Philae. In 1927, his daughter, Kathryn Bache Miller, married the theatrical producer Gilbert Miller, in Paris, France. His granddaughter, Muriel Bache Richards, married Francis Warren Pershing, son of General John J. Pershing.

He told The Literary Digest his name was pronounced Baitch, "A rhyme with aitch." (Charles Earle Funk, What's the Name, Please?, Funk & Wagnalls, 1936.)

Art collection
In addition to his high profile in the business world, Jules Bache would also become well known for his art collecting that received much press attention in 1929 when he purchased the portrait of "Giuliano de Medici," then attributed to Raphael. He would acquire numerous other important works including those by or attributed to Rembrandt, Titian (including The Bache Madonna), Albrecht Dürer, Diego Velázquez, Gerard David, Giovanni Bellini, and Sandro Botticelli, amongst others. In 1937 he opened his magnificent art collection to the public, and in 1943 donated some of his works to the Detroit Institute of Arts.

Bache was a major donor to the Department of Decorative Arts at the Metropolitan Museum of Art. At the time of his death in 1944, most of his picture collection – up to that time gifted to the Jules Bache Foundation, was given to the Museum; the remaining works of art from his estate from his house at 814 Fifth Avenue were sold at auction.

References 

1861 births
1944 deaths
American art collectors
American bankers
American financiers
American people of German-Jewish descent
Philanthropists from New York (state)
Burials at Woodlawn Cemetery (Bronx, New York)
Businesspeople from New York City
Jewish art collectors
Jewish American philanthropists
1920 United States presidential electors